Sandrine Willems (born 1968) is a Belgian writer of fiction and a director of television documentaries.

Biography 
Willems, who was born in 1968, received her doctorate in philosophy in 1991 with a thesis called Temps et mouvement dialectique dans l’œuvre de Georges Bataille. She was also licensed in drama, and got a master's degree in psychopathologie in 2007. She lives in Nice, dividing her time between writing and practicing psychotherapy for addicts.

Literary work

Fiction
 Una voce poco fa. Un chant de Maria Malibran, Paris, Éditions Autrement, 2000. 
 Les Petits Dieux (eleven novellas), Paris, Les Impressions Nouvelles: 2001.
 Le roman dans les ronces ou La légende de Charles VI, roi fou, et de sa servante, Paris, Bruxelles: Les Impressions Nouvelles, 2003. .
 Le Sourire de Bérénice, Paris, Bruxelles: Les Impressions Nouvelles, 2004. .
 Élégie à Michel-Ange, photos by Marie-Françoise Plissart, Paris, Bruxelles: Les Impressions Nouvelles, 2005. .
 À l’Espère, Bruxelles: Les Impressions Nouvelles, 2007. .
 Éros en son absence, Bruxelles: Les Impressions Nouvelles, 2009. .
 L’Extrême, Bruxelles: Les Impressions Nouvelles, 2010,

Essays
 L’Animal à l’âme. De l’animal-sujet aux psychothérapies accompagnées par des animaux, Paris: Éditions du Seuil, 2011. . Prix Verdickt-Rijdams 2012 de l’Académie royale de langue et de littérature françaises de Belgique
 Carnets de l’autre amour, Bruxelles: Les Impressions Nouvelles, 2014.

Documentaries 
 Philippe Herreweghe, et le Verbe s’est fait chant, 1999
 Chants et soupirs des renaissants, selon Paul Van Nevel, 2001
 D'errance et de racines, portrait du lieu à vivre Médiation, avec Marie-Françoise Plissart, 2014

References

External links

Living people
1968 births
21st-century Belgian novelists
Belgian women essayists
Writers from Brussels
Belgian women novelists
Belgian film directors
Belgian women film directors
Belgian essayists
21st-century essayists
21st-century Belgian women writers
21st-century Belgian writers
Mass media people from Brussels